Qila Mihan Singh, is a town of Gujranwala District in the Punjab province of Pakistan. It is located at 32°6'0N 74°5'0E with an altitude of 222 metres (731 feet).

References

Cities and towns in Gujranwala District
Populated places in Wazirabad Tehsil
Union councils of Wazirabad Tehsil